Shahriar Municipality and Suburbs Bus Organization is a public transport agency running Transit buses in Shahriar City and surrounding cities in Shahriar County in Tehran Province. The transit agency has one major bus terminal called Shahriar 22 Bahman Bus Terminal.

List of Routes

References

Transport in Iran
Bus transport in Iran